Enrico Lione, the name chosen by Enrico Della Leonessa (1865–1921) was an Italian painter active in a Divisionist style.

He was born and died in Naples. He trained and was active for many year in Rome.

References

1865 births
1921 deaths
19th-century Italian painters
19th-century Italian male artists
Italian male painters
20th-century Italian painters
Painters from Naples
Divisionist painters
20th-century Italian male artists